is a Japanese footballer who plays as a defender for J2 League club Blaublitz Akita.

Career statistics

Club
.

Notes

References

External links

1999 births
Living people
Japanese footballers
Association football defenders
Kanagawa University alumni
J2 League players
Blaublitz Akita players